Robert Scott Alexander, Baron Alexander of Weedon, KC, FRSA (5 September 1936— 6 November 2005) was a British barrister, banker and Conservative politician.

Education
He was educated at Brighton College (of which he was later President) and King's College, Cambridge.

Career at law
He was called to the Bar at the Middle Temple in 1961. An early case of note was his successful defence of Dr Caroline Deys before the General Medical Council in 1972. Alexander was one of the leading barristers of his generation and served as Chairman of the Bar Council 1985–86.  As a barrister he came to greater public fame representing Lord Archer in his libel case against the Daily Star in 1987.

He retired from the Bar in 1989, and served as Chairman of National Westminster Bank from 1989 to 1999.  He was also a director of other companies, a member of the Government's Panel on Sustainable Development and Chairman of the Royal Shakespeare Company from 2000 until ill-health forced him to retire in 2004. He served the MCC as its president and chairman. He was chancellor of the University of Exeter from 1998 to 2005. He was also the chair of JUSTICE, the human rights and law reform group, from 1990 to 2005 and served on the Wakeham Commission's report into the reform of the House of Lords. He was Treasurer of Middle Temple in 2001.

Peerage
When offered a peerage, Alexander requested that he be "of Weedon," a very small village in Buckinghamshire, just north of Aylesbury, where he had lived for some years with his third wife, Marie, at Weedon Lodge. He and his family were hosts to the annual Weedon Jazz evening for several years, used to raise money for the village.  Alexander was created a life peer as Baron Alexander of Weedon, of Newcastle-under-Lyme in the County of Staffordshire, on 11 July 1988. He sat on the Conservative Party benches.

Family
He was married three times and died from a stroke in 2005, aged 69.

References

1936 births
2005 deaths
Conservative Party (UK) life peers
Members of the Middle Temple
English barristers
English King's Counsel
Presidents of the Marylebone Cricket Club
Alumni of King's College, Cambridge
Chancellors of the University of Exeter
People from Newcastle-under-Lyme
People educated at Brighton College
NatWest Group people
20th-century English lawyers
Life peers created by Elizabeth II